Swami Vishwananda (born Mahadeosingh 'Visham' Komalram on June 13, 1978, in Beau Bassin-Rose Hill, Mauritius) is a Hindu guru and 'godman'  from Mauritius. He is the founder of Bhakti Marga, a neo-Hindu organization that has ashrams and temples in many countries. He lives in Germany, where his main ashram is in the small village of Springen (Heidenrod) in the Taunus.

Life 
Vishwananda was born into a Ravived Hindu family on the island of Mauritius. Allegedly he had an apparition of Mahavatar Babaji as a child and claims to have been initiated by him into the swami order later on. Yet Babaji is a mythical religious figure, therefore there is no evidence of him belonging to a particular swami tradition.  According to other reports, he became a disciple of the controversial Sathya Sai Baba. Like Sai Baba, he is also a 'miracle-worker'. In 1998 he visited Europe for the first time, initially England and Switzerland, later also other countries, e.g. Germany, where in July 2005 he established his first ashram and Bhakti Marga.

He also claims to be an acharya of Sri Vaishnava founded by Ramanuja, which is disputed by leading representatives. He has been granted the title Mahamandaleshwara by Nirmohi Akhada. Critics claim that he bought the title for 30,000 dollars.

Bhakti Marga activities

Lineage 
Bhakti Marga views itself standing in the tradition of Sri Vaishnava Sampradaya, into which Vishwananda has  been initiated. It represents vishishtadvaita as philosophy, translated as qualified monism. According to it, all souls are a part of God and can reflect him, but are not identical with him. The aim of the teaching is to purify the soul through devotion to God. This is done by repeating mantras (e.g. the ashtakshara mantra), singing bhajans, rituals (pujas and yajnas) and karma yoga. 

Vishwananda established his own lineage called Hari Bhakta Sampradaya on July 24, 2021, which is independent of the Shri Sampradaya, even though it is based on similar principles and is philosophically linked to Vishishtadvaita. Bhakti Marga elaborates: Most of what devotees have learned and practise remains unchanged.  However, having our own sampradaya means we are independent of any other movement or lineage. All our philosophical beliefs, rituals, rules and spiritual sadhana are exclusively approved and aligned with Guruji and His teachings. In the ashrams, however, Ramanuja, the founder Acharya of Shri Sampradaya, continues to be worshipped along with Babaji as the guru of the movement, and the Ashtaksharamantra continues to be taught. 

Apart from that, Vishwananda claims to be a master of kriya yoga in the tradition of Babaji, teaching his own version of the technique, called Atma Kriya Yoga.

Ashrams 

Every Bhakti Marga Ashram has at least one temple, which in turn often contains several idols representing deities. In addition to various Hindu deities, Vaishnava and non-vaishnava, Babaji and Ramanuja are worshipped as gurus in the main temple in Springen. The main deities in Sri Vaishnava are Narayana and Lakshmi, who are also worshiped in the Bhakti Marga temples. However, many other deities are also worshiped, some of which belong to the Vaishnava pantheon (Radha and Krishna), but some of them do not.  This worship of non-vaishnava gurus and deities, like Shiva and Durga,  distinguishes Bhakti Marga from other Vaishnava religions, like Shri Vaishnava, or Gaudiya Vaishnava, which is known in western countries mainly through the Hare Krishna movement.

In addition, the Ashram in Springen contains a Russian Orthodox chapel, in which there are also relics of Christian saints. It is not uncommon in the syncretistic system of Hinduism for Christ to be viewed as the avatar of Vishnu. However, there are currently no liturgical services in the chapel. Building of the temple has cost more than one million euros. The movement claims to have between 30 and 50 centres or temples worldwide, some of them rather small.

In November 2020 it became known that Bhakti Marga in Kirchheim in the Hersfeld-Rotenburg district of Hesse wants to set up its Hindu Germany center in the area of the Seepark Kirchheim holiday complex, which includes its own lake.

In January 2022 Bhakti Marga purchased a former Catholic Church in West Elmira, the former Our Lady of Lourdes parish, to become its first Ashram and temple in America. According to Swami Tulsidas, Bhakti Marga's representative in North America, the main deity in the new ashram will be that of Narasimha, the Hindu man-lion, an Avatar of Vishnu.

Just Love Festival 
Since 2015, Bhakti Marga has held a large, multi-day festival in Germany every year, the Just Love Festival, which attracts up to 3,000 visitors. The duration of the festival varies between three and ten days. During the festival, various spiritual music bands from different countries play, mainly bhajans and kirtans, but these can be interpreted differently, so Sanskrit hymns are also being rapped. The event is usually in the summer, the focus of the festival is Guru Purnima, a Hindu festival held every year in honor of the guru, spiritual or academic, on a full moon day. As a supporting program there are exhibitions of arts and crafts, a bazaar, a vegan restaurant, and various teaching lectures and workshops by Bhakti Marga teachers. "Just Love" is also the slogan of Bhakti Marga. It is meant to express the ideal of the movement, which places love at the center of life, love for God, but also love for the guru or the community.

Controversies

Theft of relics in Switzerland 
Various newspapers in Switzerland (Tagesanzeiger, Basellandschaftliche Zeitung) reported that Guru Vishwananda stole relics from 25 churches and monasteries with the help of two women who were his disciples. According to the newspaper, Vishwananda claimed that his actions only wanted to save the relics from destruction in an imminent war of relics. According to the managing director of Bhakti Marga, Swami Vishwananda has a previous conviction in Switzerland for disturbing the peace of the dead.

Allegations of sexual transgressions 
There are known allegations of sexual misconduct by previous followers of the guru's homosexual activities with disciples, including Brahmacharis of his organization. Sect representatives of the Evangelical Church in Germany Institute for Research on Religious and Ideological Issues are aware of this and have reported sexual assault, ranging from social pressure to rape. This led to the temporal dissolution of his organization's national branches in the US and UK in 2008.
	
In a TV documentary by the Hessischer Rundfunk from January 2022, several alleged victims were interviewed and the guru was accused of sexual abuse. The office of the district attorney in Wiesbaden confirmed several reports, which, however, would not have led to charges since they didn't find any clear proof. Vishwananda dismissed all allegations of sexual transgressions through his lawyer as reported by the HR.
	
In a lawsuit between Bhakti Marga and the HR, seven provisional injunctions were issued by the district Court of Hamburg in March 2022, which prohibited public allegations of sexual misconduct as reported widely by major German newspapers. Vishwananda filed an affidavit at the court, declaring that he never sexually assaulted anybody. Other injunctions though were rejected by the court, for example, it was permitted to report, that the guru was seeking devotion, and sexual contact to young men. Reports about 'abuse of power', the organisation being 'totalitarian' were seen as a legitimate opinions by the court, or the evaluation, that former members would be still traumatized and suffering, were also allowed. Consequently, the TV report was taken down from the media library of the ARD. From the podcast, still 5 of the original 6 episodes are online, while one was slightly modified. Since the court case is still ongoing, the HR did not make any statements if they would contest the injunctions.

Distancing by Sri Vaishnava 
Vishwananda refers to various traditions that he claims to represent. He claims to be in the tradition of Sri Vaishnava Sampradaya and to carry out initiations in their name. Officials of the Sri Vaishnava, however, state that he is not authorized to teach in the name of this tradition. In the meantime, however, Vishwananda has established his own Sampradaya which he calls Hari Bhakta Sampradaya, and which is based on the Shri Sampradaya.

Excommunication by the Catholic Orthodox Apostolic Church 
Vishwananda also pretended to be the bishop of the Russian Orthodox Church. Bhakti Marga maintains a Russian Orthodox style chapel in Springen, which also contains a box with relics. In fact, Vishwananda was originally ordained as Priest Michael by the Apostolic Orthodox Church (AOC). However, he has since been excommunicated by the Catholic Orthodox Apostolic Church (COAC), a splinter group of the AOC. Among the reasons given was Vishwananda's appointment as Mahamandaleshwara, a Hindu dignitary. The Vishwananda causa was one of the causes of the COAC split.

Om chanting at concentration camps 
On March 17, 2018, Bhakti Marga carried out a group chanting at the Buchenwald concentration camp, which led to protests. Additional Om mantra chanting sessions were also held in other locations of former concentration camps, for example on December 10, 2016, at the Mauthausen concentration camp in Austria. Critics accused Bhakti Marga of exploitation and relativization of the holocaust.

External links
Official website
Bhakti Marga
6 part podcast series 'Just Love. Der Bhakti Marga Guru und sein Geheimnis', 'Just Love. The Bhakti Marga guru and his secret' by German broadcaster ARD, German

Notes

References 

1978 births
Hindu religious leaders
Living people
21st-century Hindu religious leaders
Advaitin philosophers
Spiritual teachers
Hindu revivalists